Saturday Creek is a creek located in the Similkameen region of British Columbia. The creek flows into the Similkameen River from the west. The creek has been mined for gold.

References

Rivers of British Columbia